Kassapa III was King of Anuradhapura in the 8th century, whose reign lasted from 732 to 738. He succeeded his brother Aggabodhi V as King of Anuradhapura and was succeeded by his younger brother Mahinda I.

See also
 List of Sri Lankan monarchs
 History of Sri Lanka

References

External links
 Kings & Rulers of Sri Lanka
 Codrington's Short History of Ceylon

Monarchs of Anuradhapura
K
K
K